Margarita (also known as: Margarita: ese dulce caos) is a 2016 Peruvian comedy film directed by Frank Pérez-Garland and written by Vanessa Saba. Starring Giovanni Ciccia, Francisca Aronsson, Melania Urbina, Cesar Ritter, Vanessa Saba, Maria Grazia Gamarra and Yvonne Frayssinet. The film was released on September 8, 2016.

Synopsis 
A forty-year-old divorced father lives a relaxed life until one day his 11-year-old daughter knocks on his door to stay. His life takes a 180 degree turn because Margarita is a sweet chaos that he did not expect.

Cast 
The actors participating in this film are:

 Francisca Aronsson as Margarita
 Giovanni Ciccia as Rafo
 Melania Urbina as Claudia
 Vanessa Saba as Sandra
 César Ritter as Charlie
 Maria Grazia Gamarra as Thalia
 Yvonne Frayssinet as Rebeca

Reception 
In its first 2 days in theaters, the film drew 15.263 viewers. It subsequently drew 117,000 viewers by the end of its first week. At the end of the year, the film attracted a total of 550,279 viewers, becoming the fourth highest-grossing Peruvian film of 2016.

References

External links 

 

2016 films
2016 comedy films
Peruvian comedy films
La Soga Producciones films
2010s Spanish-language films
2010s Peruvian films
Films set in Peru
Films shot in Peru
Films about father–daughter relationships
Films about divorce